Dashu is a town under the administration of Fengjie County, Chongqing, China. , it has two residential communities and 14 villages under its administration.

References 

Township-level divisions of Chongqing
Fengjie County